Baripada may refer to:
 Baripada, a city in India
 Baripada (Odisha Vidhan Sabha constituency)
 Baripada railway station